Leptomitus is a genus of demosponge known from the Middle Cambrian Burgess Shale. Its name is derived from the Greek lept ("slender") and mitos ("thread"), referring to the overall shape of the sponge. 138 specimens of Leptomitus are known from the Greater Phyllopod bed, where they comprise 0.26% of the community.

References

External links 
 

Burgess Shale fossils
Protomonaxonida
Prehistoric sponge genera
Burgess Shale sponges
Cambrian genus extinctions